Research data archiving is the long-term storage of scholarly research data, including the natural sciences, social sciences, and life sciences. The various academic journals have differing policies regarding how much of their data and methods researchers are required to store in a public archive, and what is actually archived varies widely between different disciplines. Similarly, the major grant-giving institutions have varying attitudes towards public archival of data. In general, the tradition of science has been for publications to contain sufficient information to allow fellow researchers to replicate and therefore test the research. In recent years this approach has become increasingly strained as research in some areas depends on large datasets which cannot easily be replicated independently.

Data archiving is more important in some fields than others.  In a few fields, all of the data necessary to replicate the work is already available in the journal article.  In drug development, a great deal of data is generated and must be archived so researchers can verify that the reports the drug companies publish accurately reflect the data.

The requirement of data archiving is a recent development in the history of science.  It was made possible by advances in information technology allowing large amounts of data to be stored and accessed from central locations.  For example, the American Geophysical Union (AGU) adopted their first policy on data archiving in 1993, about three years after the beginning of the WWW. This policy mandates that datasets cited in AGU papers must be archived by a recognised data center; it permits the creation of "data papers"; and it establishes AGU's role in maintaining data archives. But it makes no requirements on paper authors to archive their data.

Prior to organized data archiving, researchers wanting to evaluate or replicate a paper would have to request data and methods information from the author.  The academic community expects authors to share supplemental data.  This process was recognized as wasteful of time and energy and obtained mixed results.  Information could become lost or corrupted over the years.  In some cases, authors simply refuse to provide the information.

The need for data archiving and due diligence is greatly increased when the research deals with health issues or public policy formation.

Selected policies by journals

Biotropica

NB: Biotropica is one of only two journals that pays the fees for authors depositing data at Dryad.

The American Naturalist

Journal of Heredity

Molecular Ecology

Nature

Science

Royal Society

Journal of Archaeological Science

Policies by funding agencies
In the United States, the National Science Foundation (NSF) has tightened requirements on data archiving. Researchers seeking funding from NSF are now required to file a data management plan as a two-page supplement to the grant application.

The NSF Datanet initiative has resulted in funding of the Data Observation Network for Earth (DataONE) project, which will provide scientific data archiving for ecological and environmental data produced by scientists worldwide. DataONE's stated goal is to preserve and provide access to multi-scale, multi-discipline, and multi-national data. The community of users for DataONE includes scientists, ecosystem managers, policy makers, students, educators, and the public.

The German DFG requires that research data should be archived in the researcher's own institution or an appropriate nationwide infrastructure for at least 10 years.

The British Digital Curation Centre maintains an overview of funder's data policies.

Data library

Research data is archived in data libraries or data archives. A data library, data archive, or data repository is a collection of numeric and/or geospatial data sets for secondary use in research. A data library is normally part of a larger institution (academic, corporate, scientific, medical, governmental, etc.). established for research data archiving and to serve the data users of that organisation. The data library tends to house local data collections and provides access to them through various means (CD-/DVD-ROMs or central server for download).  A data library may also maintain subscriptions to licensed data resources for its users to access the information. Whether a data library is also considered a data archive may depend on the extent of unique holdings in the collection, whether long-term preservation services are offered, and whether it serves a broader community (as national data archives do). Most public data libraries are listed in the Registry of Research Data Repositories.

Importance and services
In August 2001, the Association of Research Libraries (ARL) published a report presenting results from a survey of ARL member institutions involved in collecting and providing services for numeric data resources.

Library service providing support at the institutional level for the use of numerical and other types of  datasets in research. Amongst the support activities typically available:
 Reference Assistance — locating numeric or geospatial datasets containing measurable variables on a particular topic or group of topics, in response to a user query.
 User Instruction — providing hands-on training to groups of users in locating data resources on particular topics, how to download data and read it into spreadsheet, statistical, database, or GIS packages, how to interpret codebooks and other documentation.
 Technical Assistance - including easing registration procedures, troubleshooting problems with the dataset, such as errors in the documentation, reformatting data into something a user can work with, and helping with statistical methodology.
 Collection Development & Management - acquire, maintain, and manage a collection of data files used for secondary analysis by the local user community; purchase institutional data subscriptions; act as a site representative to data providers and national data archives for the institution.
 Preservation and Data Sharing Services - act on a strategy of preservation of datasets in the collection, such as media refreshment and file format migration; download and keep records on updated versions from a central repository. Also, assist users in preparing original data for secondary use by others; either for deposit in a central or institutional repository, or for less formal ways of sharing data. This may also involve marking up the data into an appropriate XML standard, such as the Data Documentation Initiative, or adding other metadata to facilitate online discovery.

Examples of data libraries

Natural sciences
The following list refers to scientific data archives.
 CISL Research Data Archive
 DataONE
 Dryad
 ESO/ST-ECF Science Archive Facility
 International Tree-Ring Data Bank
 Inter-university Consortium for Political and Social Research
 Knowledge Network for Biocomplexity
 National Archive of Computerized Data on Aging
 National Archive of Criminal Justice Data 
 NCAR Research Data Archive:  http://rda.ucar.edu
 National Climatic Data Center
 National Geophysical Data Center
 National Snow and Ice Data Center
 National Oceanographic Data Center
 Oak Ridge National Laboratory Distributed Active Archive Center
 Pangaea - Data Publisher for Earth & Environmental Science
 NASA SeaBASS - Data archive for ocean color data
 World Data Center

Social sciences
In the social sciences, data libraries are referred to as data archives. Data archives are professional institutions for the acquisition, preparation, preservation, and dissemination of social and behavioral data. Data archives in the social sciences evolved in the 1950s and have been perceived as an international movement:

By 1964 the International Social Science Council (ISSC) had sponsored a second conference on Social Science Data Archives and had a standing Committee on Social Science Data, both of which stimulated the data archives movement. By the beginning of the twenty-first century, most developed countries and some developing countries had organized formal and well-functioning national data archives. In addition, college and university campuses often have `data libraries' that make data available to their faculty, staff, and students; most of these bear minimal archival responsibility, relying for that function on a national institution (Rockwell, 2001, p. 3227).

 re3data.org is a global registry of research data repository indexing data archives from all disciplines: http://www.re3data.org
 CESSDA Members are data archives and other organisations that archive social science data and provide data for secondary use: https://www.cessda.eu/About/Consortium
 Consortium of European Social Science Data Archives: http://www.cessda.org/
 Finnish Social Science Data Archive (FSD): http://www.fsd.uta.fi/
 The Danish Data Archives: http://www.sa.dk/content/us/about_us  ; specific page (only in Danish): https://web.archive.org/web/20150318230743/http://www.sa.dk/dda/default.htm
 Inter-university Consortium for Political and Social Research: http://www.icpsr.umich.edu/
 The Roper Center for Public Opinion Research: https://ropercenter.cornell.edu/
 The Social Science Data Archive: http://dataarchives.ss.ucla.edu/
 The Cornell Center for Social Sciences: https://socialsciences.cornell.edu/ciser-data-and-reproduction-archive

See also 
 Data bank
 Data center
 Data curation
 Digital curation
 Digital preservation
 Open Data

References

Notes
 Registry of Research Data Repositories re3data.org 
 Statistical checklist required by Nature 
 Policies of Proceedings of the National Academy of Sciences (U.S.) 
 The US National Committee for CODATA 
 The Role of Data and Program Code Archives in the Future of Economic Research  
 Data sharing and replication – Gary King website 
 The Case for Due Diligence When Empirical Research is Used in Policy Formation by McCullough and McKitrick 
 Thoughts on Refereed Journal Publication by Chuck Doswell 
 “How to encourage the right behaviour” An opinion piece published in Nature,  March, 2002.
 NASA Astrophysics Data System 
 Panton Principles for Open Data in Science, at Citizendium 
 Inter-university Consortium for Political and Social Research

Further reading
 Clubb, J., Austin, E., and Geda, C. "'Sharing research data in the social sciences.'" In Sharing Research Data, S. Fienberg, M. Martin, and M. Straf, Eds. National Academy Press, Washington, D.C., 1985, 39-88.
 Geraci, D., Humphrey, C., and Jacobs, J. Data Basics. Canadian Library Association, Ottawa, ON, 2005.
Heim, Kathleen M. "Social Scientific Information Needs for Numeric Data: The Evolution of the International Data Archive Infrastructure."  Collection Management 9 (Spring 1987): 1-53.
 Martinez, Luis & Macdonald, Stuart, "'Supporting local data users in the UK academic community'". Ariadne, issue 44, July 2005.
 See the IASSIST Bibliography of Selected Works  for articles tracing the history of data libraries and its relationship to the archivist profession, going back to the 1960s and '70s up to 1996.
 See IASSIST Quarterly articles from 1993 to the present, focusing on data libraries, data archives, data support, and information technology for the social sciences.

External links 
University of California Irvine Machine Learnimg Repository

Associations
 IASSIST (International Association for Social Science Information and Service Technology) 
 DISC-UK (Data Information Specialists Committee—United Kingdom)
 APDU (Association of Public Data Users - USA)
 CAPDU (Canadian Association of Public Data Users)

Computer archives
Data management
Data publishing
Digital preservation
Information retrieval techniques
Knowledge representation
Structured storage